Yubeh may refer to:
Yubeh, Iran, a village in Khuzestan Province
Yubbe, Somalia